The 1990 Women's Hockey World Cup was the seventh edition of the Women's Hockey World Cup field hockey tournament. It was held from 2 to 13 May in Sydney, Australia. It was won by the Netherlands, who defeated host nation Australia 3–1 in the final. It was the Netherlands fifth Women's Hockey World Cup title and their third consecutive title. South Korea beat England 3–2 to finish third.

Results

Preliminary round

Pool A

Pool B

Classification round

Ninth to twelfth place classification

Crossover

Eleventh and twelfth place

Ninth and tenth place

Fifth to eighth place classification

Crossover

Seventh and eighth place

Fifth and sixth place

First to fourth place classification

Semi-finals

Third and fourth place

Final

Winning Squad

Final standings

References

External links
FIH official page
FIH results page (archived)
Results page

1990
1990 in Australian women's sport
International women's field hockey competitions hosted by Australia
1990 in women's field hockey
Sports competitions in Sydney
1990s in Sydney
May 1990 sports events in Australia